Phil Young is a native of Dunmanway in west Cork and now lives in Dublin. She graduated from Trinity College, Dublin, with an MPhil in Anglo-Irish literature, has had a number of short stories and articles published in various magazines and has featured on the RTÉ radio programme 'Sunday Miscellany'.

Works
Patricia Lynch, Storyteller, published by Liberties Press in 2005, is a biography of one of Ireland's most popular authors of children's books. Young discusses the author's life and work, shedding light on her relationship with her family and her husband, R. M. Fox, on her dealings with her various publishers, and on the creation of her many books. Although often overlooked in the past, Patricia Lynch is arguably the finest children's author Ireland has ever produced. Her writing includes The Turf-Cutter's Donkey, which was illustrated by Jack Yeats, and the Brogeen series.

References

External links
  The author's page at libertiespress.com 

Year of birth missing (living people)
Living people
Irish writers